The 2nd Curtis Cup Match was played on September 27 and 28, 1934 at the Chevy Chase Club in Chevy Chase, Maryland. The United States won 6 to 2.

Format
The contest was played over two days, with three foursomes on the first day and six singles matches on the second day, a total of 9 points. Matches were over 18 holes.

Each of the 9 matches was worth one point in the larger team competition. If a match was all square after the 18th hole extra holes were not played. Rather, each side earned  a point toward their team total. The team that accumulated at least 5 points won the competition.

Teams
Eight players for the USA and for Great Britain & Ireland participated in the event. The American's had a non-playing captain, Glenna Collett-Vare, while Britain's captain, Doris Chambers, was one of the team.

Marion Miley did not play any matches.

The British team was selected in July. Doris Chambers was the captain-manager. They travelled first to Canada on the SS Duchess of York.

The captain, Doris Chambers, and Freda Coats did not play any matches.

Thursday's foursomes matches

Friday's singles matches

References

Curtis Cup
Golf in Maryland
Curtis Cup
Curtis Cup
Curtis Cup
Curtis Cup